Cheng Sui (1605–1691) was a Qing dynasty Chinese landscape painter, poet, seal cutter, and calligrapher.

Cheng was born in She County, Anhui. His courtesy name was 'Muqian' and his sobriquet was 'Gou daoren'. Cheng's landscapes were painted using dry and dark brushstrokes. He died in 1691.

References

1605 births
1691 deaths
Qing dynasty landscape painters
Chinese seal artists
People from Huangshan
Painters from Anhui
Poets from Anhui
17th-century Chinese painters
17th-century Chinese poets
17th-century Chinese calligraphers